Bunny Dips Into Society, also known as Bunny and the Bunny Hug, is a short American silent comedy film.

Plot summary
A poor but gregarious Irish nightwatchman is falsely introduced as a count at a society ball. He proved to be very popular, especially with the ladies. In one sequence, Bunny performs a (at the time) new and popular dance, the Bunny Hug.

Release
Bunny Dips Into Society was released on May 17, 1913, in the United States, where it was presented as a split-reel with another Vitagraph comedy, Three to One. It was released in London on August 25, 1913, and was still circulating on the British mainland in late February, 1914. It accompanied Selig's production Wamba, a Child of the Jungle when that film screened in New Zealand.

The film has survived and was presented, with live musical accompaniment by Ben Model at the Museum of Modern Art in New York.

References

External links
 

1913 films
1913 comedy films
Silent American comedy films
American black-and-white films
Vitagraph Studios short films
American silent short films
American comedy short films
Films directed by Wilfrid North
1910s American films